The Southwest Yosemite League is a high school athletic league that is part of the CIF Central Section.  All of the schools are in Bakersfield, California.

Members
 Bakersfield High School
 Garces Memorial High School
 Centennial High School
 Liberty High School
 Frontier High School
 Stockdale High School

References

CIF Central Section